Anjil-e Si-ye Yek (also Romanized as Ānjīl-e Sī-ye Yek) is a village in Sajjadrud Rural District, Bandpey-ye Sharqi District, Babol County, Mazandaran Province, Iran. At the 2006 census, its population was 32, in 6 families.

References 

Populated places in Babol County